The Strength o' Ten is a 1914 American silent drama short film directed by Tom Ricketts. The film stars William Garwood and Harry von Meter.

Cast
 William Garwood as Jep
 Vivian Rich as Betty
 Harry von Meter as Betty's father
 Louise Lester as Betty's mother
 Jack Richardson as Elick
 Edith Borella
 King Clark
 B. Reeves Eason

External links

1914 films
1914 drama films
Silent American drama films
American silent short films
American black-and-white films
1914 short films
Films directed by Tom Ricketts
1910s American films